"Sorry" is a 1966 song and single by Australian rock group The Easybeats, which was written by band members George Young and Stevie Wright. It peaked at #1 on the Australian Go-Set's National Top 40 in mid November 1966. It remained at #1 on the Australian Charts for 2 weeks in November 1966.

Releases 
In addition to its 7" single release in October 1966, the song was issued on the Easyfever  EP in September 1967, along with the tracks "Friday On My Mind", "Who'll Be the One" and "Made My Bed, Gonna Lie in It". It was also the lead track on the Easybeat's third and last LP Volume 3, which they recorded in Australia, prior to moving to England.

An adaptation by  American alternative rock group The Three O'Clock appears on the album Sixteen Tambourines (1983) and has been featured in the live performances of the band in the 2013 tour. Bassist Michael Quercio introduces it as part of the Australian influence on the band.

Track listing
Parlophone Single Cat. A-8224
"Sorry" ( Stevie Wright, George Young) – 2:35
"Funny Feelin' " (Stevie Wright, George Young) – 2:28

Charts

References

1966 singles
The Easybeats songs
David Bowie songs
Number-one singles in Australia
Parlophone singles
Songs written by George Young (rock musician)
Songs written by Stevie Wright (Australian singer)
1966 songs